Jim: The James Foley Story is a 2016 American documentary film about the life of journalist and war correspondent James "Jim" Foley, directed by Brian Oakes. It premiered at the Sundance Film Festival on January 23, 2016, and on HBO on February 6, 2016.

Synopsis
Directed by Foley's childhood friend Brian Oakes, the film chronicles the life of American photojournalist James "Jim" Foley. On Thanksgiving Day 2012, Foley was kidnapped in Syria while reporting on the Syrian Civil War and went missing for two years. The infamous video of his beheading in August 2014, purportedly as a response to American airstrikes in Iraq, introduced much of the world to the Islamic State of Iraq (ISIS). Interviews with family, friends, journalist colleagues, and fellow hostages provide insight into Foley's character, work, captivity and legacy.

Reception
, this film has a rating of 91% on Rotten Tomatoes, based on 22 reviews and an average score of 6.9/10. It also has a score of 73 out of 100 on Metacritic, based on 8 critics, indicating "generally favorable reviews". The film won the Primetime Emmy Award for Exceptional Merit in Documentary Filmmaking and Audience Award: Documentary at the 2016 Sundance Film Festival.

Music
The film received an Academy Award nomination for Best Original Song for the song "The Empty Chair", written by J. Ralph and Sting and performed by Sting.

References

External links
 Official website
 
 
 

2016 documentary films
American documentary films
Primetime Emmy Award-winning broadcasts
Documentary films about jihadism
Films scored by Dan Romer
2010s English-language films
2010s American films